William's mbuna (Maylandia greshakei), also known as ice blue zebra mbuna or ice blue zebra or the Pseudotropheus ice blue among the aquarium enthusiasts,  is a species of cichlid fish endemic to Lake Malawi where it is only found at Makokola in the southeastern arm of the lake.  This species can reach a length of  TL.  It can also be found in the aquarium trade. The specific name honours the German ornamental fish importer Alfons Greshake.

References

Fish of Malawi
William's mbuna
Fish described in 1984
Taxonomy articles created by Polbot
Taxobox binomials not recognized by IUCN
Fish of Lake Malawi